Zarzecze  is a village in the administrative district of Gmina Stare Pole, within Malbork County, Pomeranian Voivodeship, in northern Poland.

For the history of the region, see History of Pomerania.

References

Zarzecze